Sharmin Sultana Sumi (better known as Sumi) is a Bangladeshi singer, songwriter, composer, playback singer. She is a lead vocalist and founding member of the band Chirkutt. She started the band in 2002. Sumi becomes first-ever Bangladeshi to participate in Womex 21. She is the only Bangladeshi singer on the summit's list and will also be the first-ever Bangladeshi to represent the country at the world's largest music summit.

Early life 
Sumi was born in Khulna. She moved to Dhaka to study where she completed graduation from Dhaka University.

Career 
Sumi formed Chirkutt in 2002. In addition to being the band's main vocalist, she is the writer and composer of most of their songs. She has written lyrics and music for other artists. She is also known as playback singer for doing playback for the film Aynabaji.

She wrote a tribute song for heavy metal guitarist Zeheen Ahmed, who died suddenly in 2017.

She also wrote the song Dhire Dhire for Habib and Nancy which has received over two million YouTube views.

Discography

Playback movies

Personal life 
Sumi's mother, Shelley Maqbul, she died on 17 January 2022 due to cervical cancer.

Awards and nominations 
Sumi was honored with Anannya Top Ten Awards by the Bangla Academy.The award was given to 10 people including Sumi by Ananya Magazine on behalf of Bangla Academy for their special contribution to the society. She also received nominations from 3rd Filmfare Awards East for Best Playback Singer and Best Lyrics.

References

External links 
 

21st-century Bangladeshi women singers
21st-century Bangladeshi singers
Year of birth missing (living people)
People from Khulna District
Living people
People from Khulna